Armando Contreras Ceballos (born 29 March 1962) is a Mexican politician affiliated with the PRD. He currently serves as Deputy of the LXII Legislature of the Mexican Congress representing Michoacán.

References

1962 births
Living people
Politicians from Michoacán
Party of the Democratic Revolution politicians
21st-century Mexican politicians
Deputies of the LXII Legislature of Mexico
Members of the Chamber of Deputies (Mexico) for Michoacán